Marlin cabinet  may refer to:

 First Marlin cabinet, the cabinet of Sint Maarten under Prime Minister William Marlin, 2015–2016
 Second Marlin cabinet, the cabinet of Sint Maarten under Prime Ministers William Marlin and Rafael Boasman, 2016–2018
 First Marlin-Romeo cabinet, the cabinet of Sint Maarten under Prime Minister Leona Marlin-Romeo, 2018
 Second Marlin-Romeo cabinet, the current Sint Maarten cabinet, since 25 June 2018